Fedir Ivanovych Danylak (born 1955) is an innovative dancer, balletmaster, choreographer and artistic director of the Barvinok Ukrainian School of Dance in Mississauga, Ontario, Canada.

Early days, Education 
Fedir Danylak was born on September 2, 1955 in Pukiv, in the Ukrainian SSR of the Soviet Union (today in the Ivano-Frankivsk Oblast of western Ukraine). Growing up in a large family during the Communist rule of Ukraine was not easy, yet from an early age Fedir always showed that he had a talent for entertaining. He loved to perform in front of crowds in his native village and after graduating from the high school, he was accepted into the Snyatyn College of Culture where he studied the art of Ukrainian dance and received training in ballet, choreography and dance. Upon his graduation, he was drafted into the Soviet Army, serving in the Long Range Missile Defence group in Sochi.

The completion of his military assignment was followed by the acceptance into the Kyiv State Institute of Culture, where Fedir received further training in teaching, training of Folk Dance Directors, and choreography in Ukrainian Folk Dance as well as other international dance styles, including Latin American dances (chacha, salsa, merengue, rhumba, etc.). Fedir also received extended training in Ballroom dance styles such as foxtrot, waltz, quickstep, and tango.

After graduating from the Kyiv Institute with a Diploma in Choreography, Fedir join a professional Ukrainian Dance Ensemble in Ivano-Frankivsk, Ukraine. The Hutsul Ensemble of Song and Dance was an ideal place for Fedir to experience and learn about the culture and dances of the Western part of Ukraine. It was in Ivano-Frankivsk that he met his future wife Hrystyna, and it was in Ivano-Frankivsk oblast that he chose to settle and begin his professional career as a choreographer.

Choreographer 
He accepted the position of Professor of Choreography at the Kalush College of Culture. Beginning his teaching career, Fedir aspired to create a broader awareness of Ukrainian Dance among his community and in Kalush as a whole. His love of Ukrainian folk traditions led him to found the first Ukrainian Folk Ensemble, Merezhyvo, as an extension of the Kalush College of Culture. Throughout its years, Merezhyvo served as a starting point for Fedir's students to gain professional dance and choreography experience in both Ukrainian and other International dances. Many of his students, after graduating from the College of Culture and the Merezhyvo Dance Ensemble, became professional dancers, choreographers, teachers, some founding and leading Ukrainian dance schools in Ukraine and abroad.

While teaching at the college in Kalush, Fedir was recruited to perform in an amateur Ukrainian Dance Ensemble Pokuttya, in the neighbouring city of Kolomyia. Participation in the ensemble allowed Fedir to further expand his significant knowledge of the folk dance traditions of the Western Ukraine regions. Also, while working under the talented choreographer and artistic director Dana Demkiv helped Fedir gain experience in management of a professional dance school. Being part of the ensemble Pokuttya also gave Fedir the opportunity to perform on the international stage.

In Canada 
In late 1996, Fedir Danylak and his family immigrated to Canada. The city of Toronto, with its vibrant and sizable Ukrainian community offered Fedir plenty of opportunity to continue in his chosen career as a teacher and choreographer. In the first year, Fedir taught Ukrainian dance at a number of Ukrainian dance school in Toronto area. Vesnianka and Academy of Ukrainian Dance presented him with the experience of teaching dance at the Ukrainian community abroad.

Elmbank 
The immigration and settling in Canada was not an easy path to follow. According to Canadian Education Standards, Fedir's university diploma from Ukraine was only equated to a simple bachelor's degree from University of Toronto. This, however, was not enough to prevent Fedir from following his chosen path as an educator. With help from his friends and family he got started as a substitute teacher at the Toronto District School Board, eventually earning an Ontario College of Teacher diploma, which allowed him to become a fully qualified teacher in Ontario. Hard work and perseverance pushed him to take on specialized course work and in time become a fully qualified Special Education Teacher. With support from Lesa Semsecen, then a Vice Principal at the Toronto's Elmbank Junior Middle Academy, he was hired as a special education teacher at the school.

Barvinok 
The year 1997 began a new path for Fedir Danylak. He was introduced to Barvinok Ukrainian Dance Ensemble's executive committee by his friend Myroslava Cummings. During the trial period at the dance school, Fedir impressed the committee with his vast knowledge of Ukrainian Dance and his ability to impart his knowledge onto his students, from little five-year-olds to dancers in their early twenties. The decades of experience teaching Ukrainian Dance in Ukraine served as a starting point in his career as an Artistic Director of Barvinok.

Soon after his hiring, Fedir's dedication to the school and his hard work earned him a position as an Artistic Director. This new role allowed him to take the school in the new direction, introduce his unique teaching methodology. As the years went on the people in the Ukrainian Community in Toronto began to notice the changes in Barvinok School of Dance. Improved quality of both dancers and dances wow the attendees of multiple multicultural dance festivals in Toronto. Dedication of the parents helped to increase the efficiency of how the school was run and allowed the freedom for Fedir to dedicate himself expand the school's dance repertoire and improve overall dance education quality.

The results were earned with hard work of both Fedir Danylak and the dancer's parents. The first trip to Ukraine in 2000 culminated with a 1st place at the International Ukrainian Dance Competition in Yalta. Participation in numerous festivals and formal events helped spread the popularity of the school and its attendance group from over a hundred students, when Fedir began, to over four hundred dancers in 2009-2010 year. Still there was more to be done, and Fedir enthusiastically followed his chosen path. In 2004, the second trip was again successful, with performances in Kharkiv at the city's 350th anniversary and in front of the thousands of spectators for the Ukraine's Independence Day in 2004.

Organized by Fedir Danylak, with the help of parental committee, third trip in 2008 was a commemorative 40th anniversary tour celebrating 40 years since the creation of Barvinok Ukrainian School of Dance. This tour featured performances in Lviv, Pukiv, Rohatyn, Ternopil and Kyiv. Its most memorable presentation, choreographed and produced by Fedir was the Holodomor dance suite. Created as a commemorate the victims of the 1932-1933 genocide of Ukrainian people, it was performed at the annual Ukrainian World Congress in front of the then president Viktor Yuschenko and prime-minister Yulia Tymoshenko of Ukraine. It gained further acclaim when it was performed at an event commemorating the Holodomor victims on November 29, 2008 in Toronto Canada.

List Of Dances 
In his time as a Barvinok's artistic director he has choreographer dozens of unique dances from all regions of Ukraine for students of all ages. This is the partial list of Ukrainian Folk Dances choreographed by Fedir Danylak. The list also includes the Latin and Ballroom suites.

1. Hopak
2. Volyn
3. Holodomor Suite
4. Wedding Suites
5. Prykarpattya Suites
6. Hutsul Suites
7. Malanka Night
8. Wild Dances
9. Buko
10. Lemko Dance
11. Zakarpattya Dance
12. Vasylechky
13. Vyjdy Hryciu
14. Welcome Suites
15. Oj Na Hori Kalyna
16. Come Out Hryhorij
17. Gypsy
18. Vasylechky

And many more, with dozens of dances for dancers from ages 5 to 29

Community 

Besides being a choreographer and an artistic director of Barvinok, Fedir also participates in the Ukrainian community as a producer and director of various festivals and community events. Recently, he was the producer of the entertainment program at the celebration of Ukrainian Independence at Centennial Park, in Toronto. He was one of the Organizers of the Ukrainian Dance Festival.

Personal life 
Danylak lives in Mississauga, Ontario. He is married to his lovely wife of 29 years Hrystyna. He has a son Taras. Fedir is also a cousin of Ukrainian Catholic Church bishop Roman Danylak.

References 
 Artistic Directors
 Pokuttya Ensemble

Notes

1955 births
Living people
Dance teachers
People from Mississauga
People from Toronto
Ukrainian choreographers
Ukrainian emigrants to Canada
Ukrainian male dancers